Hernán Bolaños Ulloa (March 20, 1912 – May 9, 1992) was a Nicaraguan-Costa Rican footballer.

He was born in Granada, Nicaragua.

Club career
He joined Alajuelense in 1930 and played for Audax Italiano, Universidad de Chile and Universidad Católica in Chile. He played for Audax Italiano alongside his twin brother, Óscar, and they were nicknamed Los hermanos del Diablo (The Devil's brothers) by the Chilean press.

International career
Bolaños played for Costa Rica appearing in nine occasions recording nine goals, in 1940 he played for Chile at the Copa Roca – loss by 2–3 against Argentina – in Buenos Aires and at the Copa Presidente Aguirre Cerda – loss by 2–3 against Uruguay – in Montevideo.

Retirement
Bolaños studied dentistry and became the Costa Rica ambassador to Chile.

Honours

Player

Club
Audax Italiano
 Chilean Primera División (1): 1936

International
Costa Rica
Central American and Caribbean Games Silver Medal (2): 1930, 1938

Individual
 Chilean Primera División Top Goalscorer (2): 1936, 1937

Manager
Costa Rica
 CCCF Championship (2): 1946, 1948

References

External links
 

1912 births
1992 deaths
People from Granada, Nicaragua
Nicaraguan emigrants to Costa Rica
Naturalized citizens of Costa Rica
Association football forwards
Costa Rican footballers
Costa Rica international footballers
Naturalized citizens of Chile
Chile international footballers
Dual internationalists (football)
Orión F.C. players
L.D. Alajuelense footballers
Audax Italiano footballers
Universidad de Chile footballers
Club Deportivo Universidad Católica footballers
Liga FPD players
Chilean Primera División players
Costa Rican expatriate footballers
Expatriate footballers in Chile
Costa Rican expatriate sportspeople in Chile
Costa Rican football managers
Chilean football managers
Costa Rica national football team managers
Ambassadors of Costa Rica to Chile
Central American and Caribbean Games silver medalists for Costa Rica
Competitors at the 1930 Central American and Caribbean Games
Competitors at the 1938 Central American and Caribbean Games
Central American and Caribbean Games medalists in football
Costa Rican people of Nicaraguan descent
Chilean people of Costa Rican descent